Jon Okafor (born August 25, 1989) is an American soccer player who plays as a midfielder.

Career

College and amateur
Okafor played four years of college soccer at Brown University between 2007 and 2010. Brown soccer team won the Ivy League Conference and went 7–0 in 2007. In 2010, Brown also reached the Sweet 16 round in the NCAA tournament.

During his time at college, Okafor also played for USL PDL club Central Jersey Spartans in 2010.

Professional career
Okafor was drafted 40th overall by Chivas USA in the 2011 MLS SuperDraft. However, he wasn't signed by the team due to contract disputes. Okafor signed his first professional contract in February 2013, when he joined Finnish club MYPA.

He went on to play for Arizona United in the USL and was a standout player with the squad before moving to Atlanta Silverbacks in the NASL.

References

1989 births
Living people
American soccer players
American expatriate soccer players
Brown Bears men's soccer players
Central Jersey Spartans players
Myllykosken Pallo −47 players
Phoenix Rising FC players
Atlanta Silverbacks players
People from Verona, New Jersey
Soccer players from New Jersey
Sportspeople from Essex County, New Jersey
Chivas USA draft picks
USL League Two players
Veikkausliiga players
USL Championship players
North American Soccer League players
Expatriate footballers in Finland
Association football midfielders
American expatriate sportspeople in Finland